The Turkmenistan men's national tennis team represents Turkmenistan in Davis Cup tennis competition and are governed by the Turkmenistan Tennis Association.

Turkmenistan currently compete in the Asia/Oceania Zone of Group IV.

Turkmenistan finished 4th in Pool B of Asia/Oceania Zone Group IV in 2008 and remains in that group for 2009.

Best Davis Cup Performance Asia/Oceania Zone Group III 3rd place in 2015.

Turkmenistan achieved its first Davis Cup victory in 2007, after 14 defeats, with wins over Bahrain and Jordan.

History
Turkmenistan competed in its first Davis Cup in 2004.

Current team (2022) 

TBD

Statistics
''Last updated: Turkmenistan - Bangladesh; 3 February 2018

Record
Total: 20–48 (29.4%)

Head-to-head record (2004–)

Record against continents

Record by decade
2004–2009: 4–22 (15.4%)
2010–2019: 16–26 (38.1%)

See also
Davis Cup
Turkmenistan Fed Cup team

External links

Davis Cup teams
Davis Cup
Davis Cup